Cricket Pavilion may refer to:
 Cricket pavilion, a pavilion at a cricket ground.
 Ak-Chin Pavilion also known as Cricket Wireless Pavilion, an amphitheater located in Phoenix, Arizona; name commonly shortened to just "Cricket Pavilion"